Plum is a purple color with a brownish-gray tinge, like that shown on the right, or a reddish purple, which is a close representation of the average color of the plum fruit. 

As a quaternary color on the RYB color wheel, plum is an equal mix of the tertiary colors russet and slate.

The first recorded use of plum as a color name in English was in 1805.

Variations of plum

Plum (Crayola)

Pale plum

At right is displayed the color pale plum, which is the pale tone of plum that is the web color called plum. 

This color is paler than the color at the head of this article and paler than the color of an actual plum.

Persian plum (prune)

Displayed at right is the color Persian plum from the Xona.com Color List.

This is the color traditionally called prune because it is a representation of the average color of prunes.  Prune is the French word for "plum", but in English the name "prune" is applied to dried plums.  This color is a representation of the color of cooked dried plums (prunes).  

The first recorded use of prune as a color name in English was in 1789.

References

See also
 List of colors

Quaternary colors
Shades of violet